Baliqayeh (also Romanized as Bālīqāyeh) is a village in Maraveh Tappeh Rural District, in the Central District of Maraveh Tappeh County, Golestan Province, Iran. At the 2006 census, its population was 8, in 4 families.

References 

Populated places in Maraveh Tappeh County